Malta competed at the 1992 Summer Olympics in Barcelona, Spain. Malta took part in athletics, shooting, judo and sailing.

Competitors
The following is the list of number of competitors in the Games.

Results by event

Athletics
Women's 100 metres
Deirdre Caruana
 Heat — 12.59 (→ did not advance, 82nd place)

Women's 200 metres
Deirdre Caruana
 Heat — 25.28 (→ did not advance, 79th place)

Women's 800 metres
Carol Galea
 Heat — DSQ (→ did not advance, 36th place)

Women's 1.500 metres
Carol Galea
 Heat — 4:33.41 (→ did not advance, 34th place)

Shooting
Horace Micallef → 30th place

Judo
Men's Competition
Jason Trevisan → eliminated in first round

Women's Competition
Laurie Pace → eliminated in first round

Sailing
Men's Sailboard (Lechner A-390)
Jean-Paul Soler
 Final Ranking — 331.0 points (→ 33rd place)

References

Official Olympic Reports

Nations at the 1992 Summer Olympics
1992
Summer Olympics